Nadezhda Yakovlevna Mandelstam (Хазина; 29 December 1980) was a Russian Jewish writer and educator, and the wife of the poet Osip Mandelstam who died in 1938 in a transit camp to the gulag of Siberia. She wrote two memoirs about their lives together and the repressive Stalinist regime: Hope Against Hope (1970) and Hope Abandoned (1974), both first published in the West in English, translated by Max Hayward.

Of these books the critic Clive James wrote, "Hope Against Hope puts her at the centre of the liberal resistance under the Soviet Union. A masterpiece of prose as well as a model of biographical narrative and social analysis it is mainly the story of the terrible last years of persecution and torment before the poet [her husband Osip] was murdered. The sequel, Hope Abandoned, is about the author's personal fate, and is in some ways even more terrible, because, as the title implies, it is more about horror as a way of life than as an interruption to normal expectancy. [The two books] were key chapters in the new bible that the twentieth century had written for us."

Early life and education
Nadezhda Yakovlevna Khazina was born in Saratov, southern Russia, the youngest of four children (she had a sister and two brothers) of a middle-class Jewish family. Her parents were Yakov Arkadyevich Khazin and Vera Yakovlevna Khazina, and the family was wealthy enough to travel. Her mother was among the first group of women in the Soviet Union to complete training as a medical doctor, and her father was an attorney. The family did not practice Judaism, and kept Russian Orthodox holidays. Later they converted to Christianity. The family moved to Kiev, Ukraine, for her father's work, and the greater cultural and educational opportunities of the larger city. There she attended school. After gymnasium (secondary school), Nadezhda studied art.

Career
Nadezhda met the poet Osip Mandelstam at a nightclub in Kiev in 1919, and they started a relationship which led to marriage in 1921–1922. They lived in Ukraine at first, but moved to Petrograd in 1922.  Later they lived in Moscow, and Georgia.

Osip was arrested in 1934 for his poem entitled "Stalin Epigram" and exiled to Cherdyn, in Perm Oblast; Nadezhda went with him. Later the sentence was lightened and they were allowed to move to Voronezh in southwestern Russia, but were still banished from the largest cities, which were the artistic and cultural centers.

After Osip Mandelstam's second arrest in May 1938 and his subsequent death at the transit camp "Vtoraya Rechka" near Vladivostok that year, Nadezhda Mandelstam led an almost nomadic life. Given the repression of the times, she tried to dodge an expected arrest, and frequently changed places of residence and took only temporary jobs. On at least one occasion, in Kalinin, the NKVD came for her the day after she had fled.

As her mission in life, she worked to preserve her husband's poetic heritage, with the goal of publication one day. She managed to keep most of it memorized because she did not trust paper.  Many years later, she was able to work with other writers to have it published.

Through the terrible years, Nadezhda Mandelstam gained her college degree and taught English in various provincial towns. After the death of Joseph Stalin on 5 March 1953, when government's repression eased, she returned to her studies and completed her dissertation in linguistics (1956).

She was not allowed to return to Moscow until 1964, following the first phase of Osip Mandelstam's rehabilitation (under Nikita Khrushchev). She had spent 20 years in a kind of internal exile until the "thaws" of the late 1950s. Nadezhda began writing her memoir, which was published in English as Hope Against Hope in 1970, in part as a way of restoring her husband's memory and integrating her own struggles. It first circulated in a samizdat version in the Soviet Union in the 1960s.

In her memoirs, Hope Against Hope (1970, 1977) and Hope Abandoned (1974, 1981), first published in the West, she made an epic analysis of her husband's life and times. She elevated her husband as the figure of an artistic martyr under Stalin's repressive regime.  She criticized the moral and cultural degradation of the Soviet Union of the 1920s and later. The titles of her memoirs are puns, as nadezhda in Russian means "hope".

In 1976, Mandelstam gave her archives to Princeton University in the United States.

In 1979, her heart condition deteriorated, and she took to her bed in early December 1980. Nadezhda Mandelstam died on 29 December 1980 in Moscow. The funeral was arranged in the Russian Orthodox rite, with the lying in state taking place on 1 January 1981, in the church of Our Lady of the Sign. She was buried on 2 January 1981, at the Kuntsevo Cemetery.

Works 
 Hope Against Hope (1970) (word play: nadezhda means "hope" in Russian)
 Hope Abandoned (1974)

References

1899 births
1980 deaths
Burials at Kuntsevo Cemetery
Writers from Saratov
Russian Orthodox Christians from Russia
Free speech activists
Jewish Russian writers
Soviet dissidents
Soviet women writers